This is a list of German television related events from 1987.

Events
26 March - Wind are selected to represent Germany at the 1987 Eurovision Song Contest with their song "Laß die Sonne in dein Herz". They are selected to be the thirty-second German Eurovision entry during Ein Lied für Brüssel held at the Frankenhalle in Nuremberg.

Debuts

Domestic
29 January - Das Erbe der Guldenburgs (1987–1990) (ZDF)
10 February - Der Landarzt (1987–2013) (ZDF)
3 March - Hans im Glück (1987) (ARD)
21 June - Jokehnen (1987) (ZDF)
9 July - Stahlkammer Zürich (1987–1991) (ARD)
26 August -  (1987) (ARD)
6 October - Praxis Bülowbogen (1987–1996) (ARD)
25 December - Anna (1987) (ZDF)

International
5 February -  The Cosby Show (1984-1992) (ZDF)
29 August -  MacGyver (1985-1992) (Sat. 1)
20 September -  Muppet Babies (1984-1991) (ZDF)

Military Television

Military Television Debuts

BFBS
3 February -  The Children of Green Knowe (1987)
26 February -  Creepy Crawlies (1987-1989)
4 May -  The Secret World of Polly Flint (1987)
18 May -  The Adventures of Spot (1987-1993)
7 July -  Fat Tulip Too (1987)
20 July -  The Eye of the Dragon (1987)
25 August -  The Honey Siege (1987)
13 September -  Inspector Morse (1987-2000)
25 October -  The New Statesman (1987-1994)
28 October -  Bad Boyes (1987-1988)
27 November -  Pulaski (1987)
16 December -  The Gemini Factor (1987)

Changes of network affiliation

Military broadcasting

Television shows

1950s
Tagesschau (1952–present)

1960s
 heute (1963-present)

1970s
 heute-journal (1978-present)
 Tagesthemen (1978-present)

1980s
Wetten, dass..? (1981-2014)
Lindenstraße (1985–present)

Ending this year

Births

Deaths